You Can't Kill Stephen King is a 2012 American comedy horror spoof film that was directed by Monroe Mann, Ronnie Khalil, and Jorge Valdés-Iga, and is the directorial debut of Khalil and the feature film directorial debut of Mann. The film had its world premiere on 14 April 2012 at the Lewiston Auburn Film Festival and was later released to DVD on 9 December 2014 through Big Screen Entertainment Group. The film follows a group of friends that decide to visit the area horror author Stephen King lives, but find themselves threatened with their own potential deaths.

Summary
Siblings Monroe (Monroe Mann) and Hilary (Crystal Arnette) have discovered that they have inherited a lake house and to make things even better, the famous horror author Stephen King is rumored to live somewhere nearby. They decide to take their friends down to the lake house to check things out, only to find immediate resistance from all of the locals, who insist that King doesn't live in the area. Despite being completely unwelcome, they decide to stay and soon find that people are being killed one by one in a manner similar to several deaths in various Stephen King stories.

Cast
Monroe Mann as Monroe Bachman
Ronnie Khalil as Ronnie
Crystal Arnette as Hilary Bachman
Kayle Blogna as Nicole
Kate Costello as Lori
Justin Brown as Lamont
Polly Humphreys as Deedee
Arthur S. Brown as Dale
Michael Bernstein as Verrill

Reception
DVD Talk gave a mostly favorable review for the film, writing that while it wasn't "outstanding" the film was overall enjoyable and "a well-made and good looking film" as long as viewers did not have overly high expectations. HorrorNews.net was more negative in their review, criticized the film for being neither innovative nor artistic while also praising it for embracing the "obvious clichés".

Awards
People’s Choice – Best Feature film Award at the Lewiston-Auburn Film Festival (2012, won)

References

External links
 

2012 comedy horror films
2012 horror films
2012 comedy films
American comedy horror films
2012 independent films
American independent films
2012 films
Parodies of horror
2012 directorial debut films
2010s English-language films
2010s American films